John 1:28 is the twenty-eighth verse in the first chapter of the Gospel of John in the New Testament of the Christian Bible.

Content
In the original Greek according to Westcott-Hort this verse is:
Ταῦτα ἐν Βηθαβαρᾶ ἐγένετο πέραν τοῦ Ἰορδάνου, ὅπου ἦν Ἰωάννης βαπτίζων.  

In the King James Version of the Bible the text reads:
These things were done in Bethabara beyond Jordan, where John was baptizing.

The New International Version translates the passage as:
This all happened at Bethany on the other side of the Jordan, where John was baptizing.

Analysis
Different manuscript traditions appear to have either Bethany and Bethabara. However, Lapide states that Bethany and Bethabara were one and the same place, or at least very close, on opposite banks of the Jordan. It was here that the Hebrews first crossed the Jordan under the leadership of Joshua when leaving Egypt, to enter the promised land. Bethabara means in Hebrew a house of passage, while Bethany means a house of ships, because ships were waiting to ferry people over the Jordan. The Bethany of Martha and Lazarus was a different place. It would appear that John choose this spot because of the abundance of water and for the memorial it held.

Commentary from the Church Fathers
Chrysostom: "John having preached the thing concerning Christ publicly and with becoming liberty, the Evangelist mentions the place of His preaching: These things were done in Bethany beyond Jordan, where John was baptizing. For it was in no house or corner that John preached Christ, but beyond Jordan, in the midst of a multitude, and in the presence of all whom He had baptized. Some copies read more correctly Bethabara: for Bethany was not beyond Jordan, or in the desert, but near Jerusalem."

Glossa Ordinaria: "Or we must suppose two Bethanies; one over Jordan, the other on this side, not far from Jerusalem, the Bethany where Lazarus was raised from the dead."

Chrysostom: "He mentions this too for another reason, viz. that as He was relating events which had only recently happened, He might, by a reference to the place, appeal to the testimony of those who were present and saw them."

Alcuin: "The meaning of Bethany is, house of obedience; by which it is intimated to us, that all must approach to baptism, through the obedience of faith."

Origen: "Bethabara means house of preparation; which agreeth with the baptism of Him, who was making ready a people prepared for the Lord. . Jordan, again, means, “their descent.” Now what is this river but our Saviour, through Whom coming into this earth all must be cleansed, in that He came down not for His own sake, but for theirs. This river it is which separateth the lots given by Moses, from those given by Jesus; its streams make glad the city of God. . As the serpent lies hid in the Egyptian river, so doth God in this; for the Father is in the Son. Wherefore whosoever go thither to wash themselves, lay aside the reproach of Egypt, (Joshua 5:9.) are made meet to receive the inheritance, are cleansed from leprosy, (2 Kings 5:14.) are made capable of a double portion of grace, and ready to receive the Holy Spirit; (2 Kings 2:9.) nor doth the spiritual dove light upon any other river. John again baptizes beyond Jordan, as the precursor of Him Who came not to call the righteous, but sinners to repentance."

References

External links
Other translations of John 1:28 at BibleHub

01:28